Anabell López Dominges (born October 23, 1964) is a Cuban singer.

Career
Dominges belonged to the Nueva trova movement in the same era as Xiomara Laugart, Santiago Feliú and Alberto Tosca. She has performed on radio and TV programs, events and competitions in the countries of Cuba, Bratislava (Slovakia), Poland. She has performed in Sweden, Finland, Denmark, Puerto Rico, Venezuela, Mexico and Argentina. Her repertoire included various genres including Cuban songs of the Vieja trova and Nueva trova and works of  Silvio Rodríguez (her half brother) and Pablo Milanés.

Discography

(LD-EGREN):
Anabel(4123) 1983
En el jardín de la noche (4341) 1988
Mala virtud (4660),1991.

(DC-EGREM):
Milagro (309) 1997.

References

External links 

 Article in Spanish
 Biography 

Cuban women singers
1964 births
Living people
Place of birth missing (living people)